Events from the year 1592 in art.

Events
Giulio Mancini comes to Rome and quickly builds a brilliant medical career, eventually becoming personal physician to Pope Urban VIII; while there, he becomes a discerning art collector.

Works
Caravaggio – Boy Peeling Fruit
Annibale Carracci
helps complete (along with brothers) Founding of Rome frescoes in Palazzo Magnani, Bologna
Assumption for Bonasoni chapel in church of San Francesco
The Madonna of Bologna for chapel of Caprara Palace (Christ Church Picture Gallery, Oxford; approximate date)
The Virgin Appears to the Saints Luke and Catherine (Musée du Louvre, Paris)
Giuseppe Cesari – Cappella Olgiati in Santa Prassede, Rome
Hendrik Goltzius – engravings of the Muses
Tintoretto – begins Last Supper fresco (San Giorgio Maggiore, Venice; completed in 1594)

Births
February 23 - Balthazar Gerbier, Dutch art advisor and designer at the English court (died 1663)
March 20 – Giovanni da San Giovanni, Italian painter (died 1636)
September 5 – Jacopo Vignali, Florentine painter (died 1664)
October 30 - Giulio Benso, Genovese painter (died 1668)
November 4 - Gerard van Honthorst, Dutch painter of Utrecht (died 1656)
date unknown
Miquel Bestard, Spanish painter from Majorca (died 1633)
Jacques Callot, printmaker and draughtsman from Lorraine (died 1635)
Ingen, Chinese Linji Chán Buddhist monk, poet, and calligrapher (died 1673)
Claes Corneliszoon Moeyaert, Catholic Dutch painter (died 1655)
Giacomo Rocca, Italian painter (died 1605)
Peter Snayers, Flemish battlefield painter (died 1666 or 1667)
Wang Duo, Chinese calligrapher and painter of the Ming Dynasty (died 1652)
probable
Jacob Pynas, Dutch painter (died 1650)
Wang Shimin, Chinese landscape painter during the Ch'ing Dynasty (died 1680)
Shao Mi, Chinese landscape painter, calligrapher, and poet during the Ming Dynasty (died 1642)

Deaths
February 13 – Jacopo Bassano, Italian landscape and genre painter (born 1510)
February 23 - Natale Bonifacio, engraver and producer of woodcuts (born 1537/1538)
March 5 – Michael Coxcie, painter (born 1499)
April 5 - Jerónimo Cosida, Spanish Renaissance painter, sculptor, goldsmith and architect (born 1510)
April 13 - Bartolomeo Ammanati, architect and sculptor (born 1511)
May - Dirck Barendsz, Dutch painter who was born and died in Amsterdam (born 1534)
July 4 - Francesco Bassano the Younger, painter (born 1559)
date unknown
Willem Boy, Flemish painter, sculptor, and architect active in Sweden (born 1520)
Alessandro Fei, Italian painter who primarily worked in a Mannerist style (born 1543)
David Kandel, Strasbourg-born botanical illustrator (born 1520)
Girolamo Muziano, Italian painter (born 1532)

 
Years of the 16th century in art